The 1937–38 Campionat de Catalunya season was the 39th since its establishment and was played between 17 October 1937 and 16 January 1938.

Division One

League table

Results

Top goalscorers

Division Two

League table

Copa Catalunya seasons
1937–38 in Spanish football